The Syro-Malabar Catholic Eparchy of Mandya is situated in Mandya city in Mandya district of Karnataka. The eparchy includes ten civil districts of Karnataka, namely Bangalore, Bangalore Rural, Chikkaballapur, Kolar, Ramanagara, Tumkur, Mysore, Chamarajanagar, Mandya and Hassan. The most recent bishop of Mandya was Antony Kariyil, who was later appointed as the Metropolitan Vicar of the Major Archbishop of the Archdiocese of Ernakulam-Angamaly  with the personal title of Archbishop on August 30, 2019. Infant Jesus Church, Henkel is the cathedral of the eparchy and the bishop's residence is at Kalenahalli, 6 km away from the city of Mandya.

History
The Eparchy of Mandya was created by bifurcating Syro-Malabar Catholic Diocese of Mananthavady. The eparchy is a suffragan eparchy of the Syro-Malabar Catholic Archeparchy of Tellicherry. The eparchy was created by Major Archbishop Varkey Vithayathil, by his decree on 18 January 2010. The eparchy has an area of 17,640 km2 with a total population of 44, 47,312 of which around 1,300 are Syro-Malabar Catholics.

Fr. Sebastian Adayantharath CMI appointed Bishop of Mandya. The territory of Mandya is extended to Bangalore. The appointment was announced on 26 August 2015 at Mt. St. Thomas Kakkanad.
The canonical territory of Mandya diocese comprises four civil Districts of Mysore, Chamarajanagar, Mandya, Hassan and in August 2015 it is extended to Bangalore, Bangalore Rural, Chikkaballapur, Kolar, Ramanagara and Tumkur.

Ordinaries 
George Njaralakatt (2010 – 2014)
Antony Kariyil  (2015 – 2019)
Sebastian Adayantharath (2019–present)

References

External links
 Eparchy of Mandya

Archdiocese of Tellicherry
Syro-Malabar Catholic dioceses
Christian organizations established in 2010
Roman Catholic dioceses and prelatures established in the 21st century
Christianity in Karnataka
2010 establishments in Karnataka